The 1976–77 Texas Longhorns men's basketball team represented the University of Texas at Austin in the 1976–77 NCAA Division I men's basketball season as a member of the Southwest Conference. They finished the season 13–13 overall, tied for fourth in the SWC with a 8–8 record. They were coached by Abe Lemons in his first season as head coach of the Longhorns. Lemons previously coached at Pan American University and Oklahoma City University. The Longhorns played their home games at Gregory Gymnasium in Austin, Texas.

Schedule

|-
!colspan=12 style=| Regular season

|-
!colspan=9 style=|SWC tournament

References

Texas Longhorns men's basketball seasons
National Invitation Tournament championship seasons
Texas